is a passenger railway station in located in the city of Tsu,  Mie Prefecture, Japan, operated by the private railway operator Kintetsu Railway.

Lines
Minamigaoka Station is served by the Nagoya Line, and is located 71.5 rail kilometers from the starting point of the line at Kintetsu Nagoya Station.

Station layout
The station was consists of two opposed side platforms, connected by a footbridge.

Platforms

Adjacent stations 
Only a small number of express trains stop at this station, and only during morning/evening commuting hours.

History
Minamigaoka Station was opened on April 28, 1989.

Passenger statistics
In fiscal 2019, the station was used by an average of 1931 passengers daily (boarding passengers only).

Surrounding area
Minamigaoka residential area
Tsu Minamigaoka Post Office
Tsu City Minamigaoka Elementary School

See also
List of railway stations in Japan

References

External links

 Kintetsu: Minamigaoka Station

Railway stations in Japan opened in 1989
Railway stations in Mie Prefecture
Stations of Kintetsu Railway
Tsu, Mie